The Anchorage Alaska Temple is the 54th operating temple of the Church of Jesus Christ of Latter-day Saints (LDS Church).  The temple serves church members in Alaska and the Yukon Territory.

History
In 1997, church president Gordon B. Hinckley, announced the building of smaller LDS temples. The first of these smaller temples was built in Monticello, Utah and the second in Anchorage, Alaska.  After the groundbreaking of the Anchorage Alaska Temple in 1998, the construction of this  temple took only nine months. 

The west side of the Anchorage Alaska Temple features the seven stars of the Big Dipper pointing to the North Star, a symbol found on the Alaskan flag and on the Salt Lake Temple. The temple walls are covered with gray and white quartz-flecked granite, and the temple design incorporates Alaskan motifs, such as likenesses of fir trees on the doorway pilasters. The stained glass is reminiscent of water, and stylized evergreens with patterns resembling native designs are used to adorn interior furnishings. 

Hinckley dedicated the temple on January 9, 1999, with more than six thousand members from as far away as the Yukon braving the freezing weather. After remodeling that nearly doubled the size of the temple, Hinckley rededicated the temple on February 8, 2004.

In 2020, the Anchorage Alaska Temple was temporarily closed in response to the coronavirus pandemic.

New structure
In January 2023, the church announced plans to rebuild the Anchorage Alaska Temple. This new building would be approximately 30,000 square feet, an increase from the 11,930 square foot temple that existed at the time of the announcement. Construction is expected to start in early 2024 and be completed in mid 2026. Following completion of the new temple, the existing temple will be removed for the building of meetinghouse.

See also

 The Church of Jesus Christ of Latter-day Saints in Alaska
 Comparison of temples of The Church of Jesus Christ of Latter-day Saints
 List of temples of The Church of Jesus Christ of Latter-day Saints
 List of temples of The Church of Jesus Christ of Latter-day Saints by geographic region
 Temple architecture (Latter-day Saints)

References

Additional reading

External links

 
 Anchorage Alaska Temple details

20th-century Latter Day Saint temples
Buildings and structures in Anchorage, Alaska
Latter Day Saint movement in Alaska
Religious buildings and structures in Alaska
Temples (LDS Church) completed in 1999
Temples (LDS Church) in the United States
1999 establishments in Alaska
Religious organizations based in Alaska